"There Was a Crooked Man" is an English nursery rhyme. It has a Roud Folk Song Index number of 1826.

Origin 
The rhyme was first recorded in print by James Orchard Halliwell in 1842:

There was a crooked man and he went a crooked mile,
He found a crooked sixpence against a crooked stile;
He bought a crooked cat, which caught a crooked mouse,
And they all liv'd together in a little crooked house.

It gained popularity in the early twentieth century. One legend suggests that this nursery rhyme originated in the once prosperous wool merchant’s village of Lavenham, about 70 miles northeast of London, having been inspired by its multicolored half-timbered houses leaning at irregular angles as if they are supporting each other. Other sources state that the poem originates from British history, specifically the period of the Scottish Stuart King Charles I of England (1600–1649).

The crooked man is reputed to be the Scottish General Sir Alexander Leslie, who signed a covenant securing religious and political freedom for Scotland. The "crooked stile" in the poem was the alliance between the parliaments of England and Scotland or the border between the two, depending on the source. "They all lived together in a little crooked house" refers to the fact that the English and Scots had at last come to an agreement, despite the continuing great animosity between the two peoples, who nonetheless had to live with each other due to their common border.

The great recoinage around 1696 led to sixpence coins that were made of very thin silver and were easily bent, becoming "crooked".

Related artwork
"—And He Built a Crooked House—" is a science fiction short story by American writer, Robert A. Heinlein, first published in Astounding Science Fiction in February 1941. The house was based on a four-dimensional tesseract, with eight cubical rooms.

The Conjuring 2 features the crooked man as one of his antagonist

References 

English folk songs
English children's songs
Traditional children's songs
Songs about cats
Cats in literature
English nursery rhymes
Songwriter unknown
Year of song unknown